UltimateCleaner 2007 was a rogue anti-spyware program that created fake Windows security messages and other security warnings in order to trick users into believing that computer was infected with spyware threats and that they needed to purchase the full version of UltimateCleaner 2007 to remove the threat.

See also
:Category:Spyware removal — programs which find and remove spyware
Computer surveillance 
Adware
Malware
Trojan horse (computing)

Notes and references
 Information and Removal Instructions for UltimateCleaner 
 Non-Techie Removal Guide for UltimateCleaner

Rogue software
Scareware